Cornelius Bernard Huggins, (born June 1, 1974), also known as Outlaw between fans, is a footballer from Saint Vincent and the Grenadines formerly playing as a centre back and a vice-captain for Kedah FA in the Malaysian Super League.

Career 
His game is valued highly by the Kedah FA management who have placed their trust on him in defence starting from 2004 season. He was a part of the squad that won historical double treble titles.

International 
Huggins has made numerous appearances for the Saint Vincent and the Grenadines national football team, including playing at the 1996 CONCACAF Gold Cup. He is also the most-capped Saint Vincentian defender in international competitions especially in the Caribbean Cup.

Honours
Malaysia Cup: 2006/2007, 2007/2008
Malaysian Super League: 2006/2007, 2007/2008
Malaysian Premier League: 2005/2006
Malaysian FA Cup: 2006/2007, 2007/2008

References

External links
 Interview on YouTube

1974 births
Living people
People from Kingstown
Expatriate footballers in Malaysia
Expatriate soccer players in the United States
Association football defenders
Saint Vincent and the Grenadines footballers
Saint Vincent and the Grenadines international footballers
1996 CONCACAF Gold Cup players
Saint Vincent and the Grenadines expatriate footballers
Saint Vincent and the Grenadines expatriate sportspeople in Malaysia
Saint Vincent and the Grenadines expatriate sportspeople in the United States
Saint Vincent and the Grenadines football managers
Saint Vincent and the Grenadines national football team managers
Pastures F.C. players
Vancouver Whitecaps (1986–2010) players
Virginia Beach Mariners players
Saint Vincent and the Grenadines expatriate sportspeople in Canada
Expatriate soccer players in Canada
A-League (1995–2004) players
USL First Division players